The BP Parawing is an American paramotor/powered parachute designed and produced by Spartan Microlights.

Design and development
The aircraft was designed to comply the US FAR 103 Ultralight Vehicles rules. It features a paraglider-style high-wing, single-place or optionally two-place-in-tandem accommodation and a single  Hirth F-33,  Hirth F-36 or  Radne Raket 120 engine in pusher configuration. As is the case with all paramotors, take-off and landing is accomplished by foot, although this aircraft can also fit optional wheels.

Variants
BP Parawing 115
Version with the  Hirth F-36 powerplant.
BP Parawing 95
Version with the  Hirth F-36 powerplant.
BP Parawing Carbon
Version with the  Radne Raket 120 powerplant.
BP Parawing Super Light
Version with the  Radne Raket 120 powerplant.
BP Parawing Super Light 2
Version with the  Radne Raket 120 powerplant.
BP Parawing Super Light 3
Version with the  Radne Raket 120 powerplant.

Specifications (BP Parawing)

References

External links

1990s United States ultralight aircraft
Single-engined pusher aircraft
Paramotors
Powered parachutes
Spartan Microlights aircraft